Saint-Honoré-de-Témiscouata (Canada 2011 Census population 780) is a municipality in the region of Bas-Saint-Laurent, Quebec, Canada.

See also
 List of municipalities in Quebec

References

External links

Municipalities in Quebec
Incorporated places in Bas-Saint-Laurent